Sclerophrys lemairii is a species of toad in the family Bufonidae.
It is found in Angola, Botswana, Republic of the Congo, Democratic Republic of the Congo, Namibia, and Zambia.
Its natural habitats are dry savanna, moist savanna, subtropical or tropical dry lowland grassland, subtropical or tropical seasonally wet or flooded lowland grassland, swamps, and freshwater marshes.
It is threatened by habitat loss.

References

lemairii
Amphibians described in 1901
Taxonomy articles created by Polbot